Paul Dixon (born 4 August 1973) is a former ice hockey defenceman and player-coach from Sunderland, England. He is currently the head coach for the Guildford Flames of the Elite Ice Hockey League, the top-tier of hockey in the United Kingdom.

Playing career 
After working his way through the Durham Wasps youth system, Dixon made his first appearance for the senior side in the 1989/90 season. After the 1990/91 season, Dixon moved to the Hull-based Humberside Seahawks where he helped them gain promotion to the Heineken League Premier Division Dixon then played a season with the Sheffield Steelers where he and the team achieved the same feat. He moved back home to play for the Durham Wasps for 3 years until they were sold and moved to Newcastle Upon Tyne in 1996, where he spent another 3 years playing for the Newcastle-based team, now known as Newcastle Vipers.

In the summer of 1999 Dixon made the move south to Surrey-based outfit the Guildford Flames where he remains as player/head coach. From the start of his Flames career Dixon was given the alternate captain position. After being awarded the Alan Weeks Trophy in 2001, he was made captain of the side, a position he held until taking over as head coach in 2007, thus making him the longest serving Flames captain. During his time with the Flames, Dixon was selected to the British National League first all-star team on three occasions (2001, 2004 & 2005) and the second team once (2003), as well as the English Premier Ice Hockey League first all-star team in 2006 & 2007. and second all-star team in 2008 and 2009. Since 1999, he has helped the Surrey team to an ntl: Christmas Cup championship as well as a BNL league title, two BNL play-off championships, 2 EPIHL League titles and 2 EPIHL Cup titles. He currently sits in 6th for All-time Flames points, and is the highest scoring defenceman.

Playing record

Year by Year Record

Includes Play-Offs & Cups

Note: GP = Games played; G = Goals; A = Assists; Pts = Points; PIM = Penalty Minutes. All Stats from either Eurohockey.net' or Guildford Flames' websites

Coaching career
For the 2005/2006 season, head coach Stan Marple announced that Dixon would be undertaking assistant coach duties while still playing for the Guildford Flames. During the 2006/2007 season, Marple announced it would be his last and that Dixon would take over as player/head coach after the season. His first new signing was star forward Lukas Smital from local rivals the Bracknell Bees. In his first season as Flames coach Dixon led his team to another EPIHL Championship with a 30–5–5 league regular season record, earning him EPIHL coach of the year. 2008/09 was less successful with a 3rd-place finish in the league and no silverware with a regular season record of 34–17–3.

Coaching Career statistics
Including League, Cups and Playoffs

International play
Dixon was first selected to play for Team GB in the 1995 IIHF World Championship Division I (Formerly Pool B). Between 1995 and 2004, Dixon made 54 Appearances scoring 4 goals and adding 15 assists. It was widely thought that Dixon had retired from International Ice Hockey, which was disproved in January 2008 with Dixon's inclusion into the GB squad for the Euro tournament in France, although he had to pull out through injury.

International playing record

Year-by-year record

Note: GP = Games played; G = Goals; A = Assists; Pts = Points; PIM = Penalty minutes. All stats from either Eurohockey.net

Honours and awards
Best defenceman at the European Junior Championships Pool C 1990–91
Player's Player 1999–00
Best British Defenceman 2000–01
Named to the BNL All Star First Team 2000–01, 2003–04 and 2004–05
Named to the BNL All Star Second Team 2002–03
Named to the EPIHL All Star Team First 2005–06 and 2006–07
Named to the EPIHL All Star Team Second 2007–08
Named EPIHL Coach of the Year 2007–08

External links
Eurohockey.net Profile

Guildford Flames Official Website

References

1973 births
British Hockey League players
British National League (1996–2005) players
Durham Wasps players
English ice hockey defencemen
English Premier Ice Hockey League players
Guildford Flames players
Newcastle Cobras players
Newcastle Riverkings players
Sportspeople from Sunderland
Living people
Ice hockey player-coaches